Zweisimmen railway station is a railway station in the municipality of Zweisimmen, in the Swiss canton of Bern. It is the terminus of the standard gauge Spiez–Zweisimmen line (from north) and of the  Montreux–Zweisimmen and Zweisimmen–Lenk im Simmental lines (separately from south, Montreux Oberland Bernois Railway). The station is across the street from the valley station of the gondola to the top of the Rinderberg.

Layout 
Zweisimmen has three island platforms and one side platform. The westernmost platform is an island platform serving tracks 3 and 4. These are metre gauge tracks serving the Montreux–Lenk im Simmental railway line and terminate at the station. The next platform east is another island platform. On the west side is track 5, also a metre gauge track that terminates at the station. On the east side is track 6, one of two dual gauge through tracks that connects the Montreux–Zweisimmen railway line with the Spiez–Zweisimmen railway. Next to that platform is the third island platform, serving tracks 7 and 8. Track 7, like 6, is a dual-gauge track. Finally, on the east side of the station is a side platform serving track 12. Track 12 connects with the Spiez–Zweisimmen railway line and terminates at the station.

Services 
The following services stop at Zweisimmen:

 Panorama Express/Regio: hourly or better service to Montreux.
 RegioExpress: eight trains per day to Spiez, with four trains continuing from Spiez to Interlaken Ost.
 Regio:
 hourly service to Bern.

Gallery

References

External links 
 
 

Railway stations in the canton of Bern
BLS railway stations
Montreux Oberland Bernois Railway stations